Serge Bourguignon (born 3 September 1928) is a French film director and screenwriter. His film Sundays and Cybele won the Academy Award for Best Foreign Language Film in 1962.

Filmography

References

External links

1928 births
Living people
French film directors
French male screenwriters
French screenwriters
Directors of Best Foreign Language Film Academy Award winners